The 3rd United Andhra Pradesh Legislative Assembly election was held in 1962. It was the third after formation of states. The INC won 177 seats out of 300 seats. While, CPI won 51 seats and Independents also won 51 seats. 

The number of polling stations was 21,587 and the number of electors per polling station was 881.

Results

Elected members

Notes

References

 State Assembly elections in Andhra Pradesh
1960s in Andhra Pradesh
Andhra Pradesh